The 1964 Vermont Catamounts football team represented the Vermont Catamounts football team of the University of Vermont during the 1964 NCAA College Division football season.  With a 7–1 record (3–1 in the Yankee Conference), this was Vermont's most successful season.

Schedule

References

Vermont
Vermont Catamounts football seasons
Vermont Catamounts football